This is the list of notable stars in the constellation Reticulum, sorted by decreasing brightness.

See also
List of stars by constellation

References
Notes

Bibliography

List
Reticulum